Michael Klemm (born 13 June 1965) is a German former handball player. He was a member of the Germany men's national handball team. He was part of the team at the 1992 Summer Olympics, playing four matches. On club level he played for TSV Bayer Dormagen in Duisburg.

References

1965 births
Living people
German male handball players
Handball players at the 1992 Summer Olympics
Olympic handball players of Germany
Sportspeople from Duisburg